Tranås AIF (sometimes abbreviated "TAIF") is a Swedish sports club active in a number of sports including ice hockey.  The ice hockey club, Tranås AIF Ishockeyförening, better known as Tranås AIF Hockey (or Tranås AIF IF), played several season in Sweden's second-highest league, Allsvenskan, but since being relegated in 2003 has played in Division 1, the third tier of ice hockey in Sweden.

The club has also had a bandy section and used to play in the top-tier Swedish bandy league.

External links
 Hockey club official website
 Hockey team profile on Eliteprospects.com

Ice hockey teams in Sweden
Ice hockey clubs established in 1905
Bandy clubs established in 1905
Defunct bandy clubs in Sweden
1905 establishments in Sweden
Ice hockey teams in Jönköping County